The solubility of fullerenes is generally low. Carbon disulfide dissolves 8g/L of  C60, and the best solvent (1-chloronaphthalene) dissolves 53 g/L. up  Still, fullerenes are the only known allotrope of carbon that can be dissolved in common solvents at room temperature. Besides those two, good solvents for fullerenes include 1,2-dichlorobenzene, toluene, p-xylene, and 1,2,3-tribromopropane. Fullerenes are highly insoluble in water, and practically insoluble in methanol.

Solutions of pure C60 (buckminsterfullerene) have a deep purple color. Solutions of C70 are reddish brown. Larger fullerenes  to  have a variety of colors.  has two optical forms, while other larger fullerenes have several structural isomers.

General considerations
Some fullerene structures are not soluble because they have a small band gap between the ground and excited states. The  structure is also in this class, but the endohedral version with a trapped lanthanide-group atom is soluble due to the interaction of the metal atom and the electronic states of the fullerene. Researchers had originally been puzzled by  being absent in fullerene plasma-generated soot extract, but found in endohedral samples. Small band gap fullerenes are highly reactive and bind to other fullerenes or to soot particles.

Out of solution, this structure decomposes into usual face-centered cubic (fcc)  in few minutes' time. At temperatures above solubility maximum the solvate is not stable even when immersed in saturated solution and melts with formation of fcc . Crystallization at temperatures above the solubility maximum results in formation of pure fcc .

Solubility table

See also
Fullerene chemistry

References

Fullerenes
Solutions